Gabrielle ("Gabbie" or "Gaby") Elise Domanic (born February 24, 1985, in Orange, California) is an American water polo player, who won the gold medal with the USA Women's Team at the 2003 FINA Women's World Water Polo Championship in Barcelona, Spain.

See also
 List of world champions in women's water polo
 List of World Aquatics Championships medalists in water polo

References

External links
 

1985 births
Living people
American female water polo players
Sportspeople from Orange, California
World Aquatics Championships medalists in water polo
UCLA Bruins women's water polo players